Sage Jaimini was an ancient Indian scholar who founded the Mīmāṃsā school of Hindu philosophy. He is considered to be a disciple of Rishi/Sage Veda Vyasa, the son of Parāśara Rishi. Traditionally attributed to be the author of the Mimamsa Sutras  and Jaimini Sutras, he is estimated to have lived around 4th to 2nd century BCE. Some scholars place him between 250 BCE and 50 CE. His school is considered non-theistic, but one that emphasized rituals parts of the Vedas as essential to Dharma. 

Jaimini's guru was Badarayana, the latter founded the Vedanta school of Hindu philosophy, emphasizing the knowledge parts of the Vedas, and credited with authoring Brahma Sutras. Both Badarayana and Jaimini quoted each other as they analyzed each other's theories, Badarayana emphasizing knowledge while Jaimini emphasizes rituals, sometimes agreeing with each other, sometimes disagreeing, often anti-thesis of the other.

Jaimini's contributions to textual analysis and exegesis influenced other schools of Indian philosophies, and the most studied bhashya (reviews and commentaries) on Jaimini's texts were by scholars named Shabara, Kumarila and Prabhakara.

Works
Jaimini is most known for his great treatise Purva Mimamsa Sutras, also called Karma-mimamsa (“Study of Ritual Action”), a system that investigates the rituals in the Vedic texts. The text founded the Purva-Mimamsa school of Ancient Indian philosophy, one of the six Darsanas or schools of Ancient Indian philosophy.

Dated to ca. the 4th century BCE, the text contains about 3,000 sutras and is the foundational text of the Mimamsa school. The text aims at an exegesis of the Vedas with regard to ritual practice (karma) and religious duty (dharma), commenting on the early Upanishads. Jaimini's Mimamsa is a ritualist (karma-kanda) counter-movement to the Self-knowledge (Atman) speculations of the Vedanta philosophy. His Mimamsa Sutra was commented upon by many, of which Śābara was among the earliest.

Jaimini also wrote a version of the Mahabharata narrated to him by his preceptor Vyasa, but today, only the Ashvamedhika Parva and the Shasramukhacaritam of his work are available.

Other mentions

Samaveda
When Rishi Veda Vyasa classified ancient Vedic hymns into four parts based on their use in the sacrificial rites, and taught them to his four chief disciples – Paila, Vaisampayana, Jaimini and Sumantu, Samaveda was transmitted to rishi Jaimini.
"He classified the Veda into four, namely Rig, Yajur, Sama and Atharva. The histories and the Puranas are said to be the fifth Veda." 
- Brahmanda Purana 1.4.21

Markandeya Purana
One of the major Puranas, the Markandeya Purana, opens with a dialogue between sage Jaimini and Markandeya.

See also
 Samaveda
 Guru Purnima
 Indian Mathematics

References

External links
 Purva Mimansa

Rishis
4th-century Indian philosophers
4th-century Indian writers
Atheist philosophers
Hindu philosophers and theologians
Indian male writers